Brent's algorithm is either of the following:

 Brent's algorithm for cycle detection
 Brent's method for finding roots of functions of one real variable